A fare is the fee paid by a passenger allowing them to make use of a public transport system. 

Fare or FARE may also refer to:

Places
Fare, French Polynesia, a village on Huahine in the Society Islands, French Polynesia

Fictional characters
John Fare, a character in a 1968 story by N.B. Shein

Films
The Fare, a 2018 mystery film.

Organisations
Foundation for Alcohol Research and Education, Australia
Fare!, political party in Italy founded in 2015
Food Allergy Research & Education 
Football Against Racism in Europe 
Forces Alternatives pour le Renouveau et l'Emergence (FARE), Alternative Forces for Renewal and Emergence, political party in Mali
Fuerza Aérea de la República Española, the Spanish Republican Air Force

See also

Fair (disambiguation)
Faire (disambiguation)
Fares (disambiguation)
La Fare (disambiguation)